The Laforey Baronetcy, of Whitby in the County of Devon, was a title in the Baronetage of Great Britain. It was created on 2 December 1789 for the naval commander John Laforey. He was succeeded by his son, the second Baronet. He was an Admiral in the Royal Navy. He was childless and the title became extinct on his death in 1835.

Laforey baronets, of Whitby (1789)
 
Sir John Laforey, 1st Baronet (–1796)
Sir Francis Laforey, 2nd Baronet (1767–1835)

References

Extinct baronetcies in the Baronetage of Great Britain